Lunda is an unincorporated community in Liberty Township, Union County, Ohio, United States.

The Lunda Post office was established on August 18, 1896, but was discontinued on February 14, 1906. The mail service is now sent through the West Mansfield branch.

References 

Unincorporated communities in Union County, Ohio
Unincorporated communities in Ohio